Acalolepta admixta is a species of beetle in the family Cerambycidae. It was described by Charles Joseph Gahan in 1894. It is known from Malaysia, the Andaman Islands, and Myanmar.

References

Acalolepta
Beetles described in 1894